Marah Presents Mountain Minstrelsy of Pennsylvania is an  album by Marah, released in 2014.

Track listing
Falling of the Pine
A Melody of Rain
An Old Timer's Plaint
Harry Bell
Luliana
Sing!, Oh Muse of the Mountain
Ten Cents at the Gate
Mountain Minstrelsy
Rattlesnake
The Old Riverman's Regret
Mother, Dad & Joe

Personnel
David Bielanko (Guitar, Banjo, Vocals, Harmonica, Dulcimer)
Christine Smith (Piano, Vocals, Estey Pump Organ, Accordion, Barbershop Quartet and Tuba Arrangements)
Kai Schafft (Banjo, Tenor Guitar)
Jimmy James Baughman (Giant Stand Up Bass)
Chris Rattie (Drums, Guitar, Vocal Harmonies)
Gus Tritsch(Fiddle, Banjo, Vocals)

References

2014 albums
Marah (band) albums